The 1998 Waldbaum's Hamlet Cup was a men's tennis tournament played on Hard courts in Long Island, United States that was part of the International Series of the 1998 ATP Tour. It was the eighteenth edition of the tournament and was held from 24 to 30 August 1998.

Finals

Singles 

 Patrick Rafter defeated  Felix Mantilla, 7–6(7–3), 6–2.

Doubles 

 Julián Alonso /  Javier Sánchez defeated  Brandon Coupe /  Dave Randall, 6–4, 6–4.

References 

 
Waldbaum's Hamlet Cup
1998